Prestonfield is a football stadium in the royal burgh of Linlithgow, West Lothian, Scotland. It is the home stadium of Linlithgow Rose of the East of Scotland Football League.

The stadium was opened in 1949 and currently consists of a covered and seated stand opposite a covered enclosure with the rest of the ground being concrete terracing. The current capacity is 2,264 of whom 301 can be seated.

References

Sports venues in West Lothian
Linlithgow Rose F.C.
Sports venues completed in 1949
Linlithgow